Elizabeth Ferris may refer to:
Elizabeth Ferris (diver) (1940–2012), British diver
Elizabeth Ferris (wheelchair rugby) (born c. 1986), wheelchair rugby player 
Elizabeth G. Ferris (born c. 1950), Brookings fellow